Joseph or Joe West may refer to:

 Joe West (umpire) (born 1952), Major League Baseball umpire, actor, and country singer
 Joe West (gridiron football) (born 1984), American football and Canadian football wide receiver 
 Joe West (footballer) (1910–1965), English football forward 
 Joseph West (athlete) (born 1924), Irish Olympic runner
 Joseph R. West (1822–1898), U.S. Senator from Louisiana
 Joseph West (politician) (died 1691), Governor of South Carolina
 Joe West (Arrowverse), a character in the Arrowverse franchise